10th Regiment may refer to:
   10th Field Regiment Royal Artillery
 10th (R/Fus) Medium Regiment Royal Artillery 1942–1946, from 16th Battalion Royal Fusiliers (City of London Regt)
 2/10th Armoured Regiment (Australia), a unit of the Australian Army
 2nd/10th Medium Regiment, Royal Australian Artillery, a unit of the Australian Army
 10th Light Horse Regiment (Australia), a unit of the Australian Army
 10th Malay Regiment, an irregular formation which opposed the British occupation of Malaysia
 10th (North Lincoln) Regiment of Foot, a unit of the British Army
 10th Royal Hussars, a unit of the British Army
 10th Royal Tank Regiment, a unit of the British Army
 10th Regiment (Denmark), an infantry unit of the Danish Army 1951–1961
 10th Infantry Regiment (United States), a unit of the United States Army
 10th Cavalry Regiment (United States), a unit of the United States Army
 10th Marine Regiment (United States), a unit of the United States Marine Corps

American Revolutionary War regiments
 10th Massachusetts Regiment
 10th North Carolina Regiment
 10th Pennsylvania Regiment
 10th Virginia Regiment

American Civil War regiments
 Confederate (Southern) Army regiments
 10th Regiment Alabama Infantry
 10th Georgia Regiment
 Union (Northern) Army regiments
 10th Illinois Volunteer Infantry Regiment (3 Year)
 10th Illinois Volunteer Infantry Regiment (3 Month)
 10th Illinois Volunteer Cavalry Regiment
 10th Iowa Volunteer Infantry Regiment
 10th Maine Volunteer Infantry Regiment
 10th Massachusetts Volunteer Infantry
 10th Michigan Volunteer Infantry Regiment
 10th Michigan Volunteer Cavalry Regiment
 10th Minnesota Volunteer Infantry Regiment
 10th New Hampshire Volunteer Regiment
 10th Vermont Infantry Regiment
 10th West Virginia Volunteer Infantry Regiment
 10th Wisconsin Volunteer Infantry Regiment

See also

 Tenth Army (disambiguation)
 X Corps (disambiguation)
 10th Division (disambiguation)
 10th Brigade (disambiguation)
 10th Group (disambiguation)
 10 Squadron (disambiguation)